Ogbourne St Andrew is a civil parish and small village in Wiltshire, England,  north of Marlborough. The parish is on the banks of the River Og and includes the hamlets of Ogbourne Maizey and Rockley.

History 
Domesday Book of 1086 recorded a relatively large settlement of 71 households at Ocheborne, corresponding to the later manors of St Andrew and St George. Ogbourne Priory was a dependency of Bec Abbey in Normandy from the 12th century until the early 15th; there may have been a priory building in the 13th century but later the priory existed only as a legal name for the administration of the Bec estates in England.

Parish church 

The Anglican Church of St Andrew has 12th-century origins and work from that century survives in the north door (with chevron hoodmould) and details of the arcades; the piscina at the south side is a re-used capital. The chancel (with south door) was built in the 13th century. In the 15th century the west tower was inserted, and the church was re-roofed and the clerestory added.

The tower has a ring of five bells including a tenor cast c.1450. The church was restored by William Butterfield in 1847–49 and was recorded as Grade I listed in 1958. Today the parish is part of the Ridgeway Benefice which also covers Ogbourne St George and Chiseldon.

In the churchyard there is a round barrow, excavated in 1880 by Henry Cunnington.

Other buildings 
Rockley had a chapel of ease in the 13th century, dedicated to St Leonard; it was demolished in the 16th century. A new chapel of All Saints was built in 1872 and closed in 1961.

Rockley Manor dates from the 18th century and is Grade II* listed.

Former railway
The Swindon, Marlborough and Andover Railway was built through the Og valley in 1881. Ogbourne station was at Ogbourne St George; a siding at Ogbourne St Andrew was used by the nearby horse stables. The line was closed in 1961.

Amenities
Local primary-level children usually go to the school in Ogbourne St George or to Marlborough.

References

External links

 Parish website
 Parish history group
 

Villages in Wiltshire
Civil parishes in Wiltshire